Burns Like Fire is the second studio album by Bob Ostertag, released in 1992 by RecRec Music.

Reception

François Couture of AllMusic says "Burns Like Fire remained unnoticed somehow, which is too bad since, even though not as strong as Attention Span or Say No More, it represents an important step in the man's artistic development."

Track listing

Personnel
Adapted from the Burns Like Fire liner notes.

Musicians
 Fred Frith – guitar (5)
 Bob Ostertag – Ensoniq EPS-16+ sampler, production, recording (1, 4)

Production and design
 Rob Fein – design
 David Wojnarowicz – cover art

Release history

References

External links 
 Burns Like Fire at Bandcamp
 Burns Like Fire at Discogs (list of releases)

1992 albums
Bob Ostertag albums
RecRec Music albums
LGBT-related albums